The United States Senate election of 1922 in New Jersey was held on November 7, 1922. 

Incumbent Republican Senator Joseph S. Frelinghuysen Sr. ran for re-election to a second term in office, but was defeated by Democratic Governor of New Jersey Edward I. Edwards.

Primary elections were held September 26.

This was the second of four straight elections to this seat in which the incumbent was defeated.

Republican primary

Candidates
Joseph S. Frelinghuysen Sr., incumbent Senator
George Lawrence Record, former Jersey City corporation counsel

Campaign
Though Frelinghuysen was opposed in the primary by George Record, who had made several unsuccessful campaigns for office, Frelinghuysen was assured of strong political backing and considered a heavy favorite for renomination.

Record criticized Frelinghuysen's vote to acquit Truman Handy Newberry and declared that he was out to break up the "Millionaires' Club" in the Senate. He was informally endorsed by many union officials, whom he had counseled as a private attorney.

Results
Frelinghuysen defeated Record by a two-to-one margin.

Democratic primary

Candidates
Edward I. Edwards, Governor of New Jersey

Withdrew
Alexander Simpson, State Senator from Hudson County

Declined
William B. Gourley, Paterson attorney
Henry van Dyke Jr., Princeton University professor of English literature

Campaign
The first candidate to announce for the Democratic nomination was State Senator Alexander Simpson.

On April 14, Governor Edward I. Edwards announced his candidacy as a "wet," or anti-Prohibitionist candidate. Senator Simpson, who claimed he had not entered the race until Edwards had pledged not to run, demurred.

Results
Edwards was ultimately unopposed for the nomination.

General election

Candidates
George A. Bauer (Socialist)
John C. Butterworth (Socialist Labor)
Edward I. Edwards (Democrat), Governor of New Jersey
Joseph S. Frelinghuysen (Republican), incumbent Senator
James P. Love (Independent Lincoln)
William J. Wallace (Single Tax), candidate for Mayor of New York City in 1917
Louis F. Wolf (Workers)

Results

See also 
1922 United States Senate elections

References

New Jersey
1922
1922 New Jersey elections